Taywara (Teyvareh) district is located in the southern part of Ghor province in Afghanistan. The population is 88,900 people. The district center is the town of Taywara.

The district has  of gravel roads. The terrain is mountainous and in the winter the roads are often inaccessible.

References

External links 
 Map of Settlements IMMAP, September 2011

Districts of Ghor Province